Ataxia-pancytopenia syndrome is a rare autosomal dominant disorder characterized by cerebellar ataxia, peripheral neuropathies, pancytopenia and a predilection to myelodysplastic syndrome and acute myeloid leukemia.

Signs and symptoms

Genetics

This syndrome is caused by mutations in the sterile alpha motif domain containing 9-like (SAMD9L) gene. This gene is located on the long arm of chromosome 7.

Diagnosis

History

This syndrome was first described in 1981.

References

Syndromes affecting the cerebellum
Syndromes affecting blood
Syndromes with tumors